Shixi Station is a station on Guangfo Line. It will be located at the underground of Gongye Dadao near Xinyuying Petrol Station in Haizhu District, Guangzhou, China. It entered operation on December 28, 2018.

Station layout

References

Foshan Metro stations
Guangzhou Metro stations in Haizhu District
Railway stations in China opened in 2018